Yevgeni Aleksandrovich Yaroslavtsev (born 31 January 1982) is a former Russian former professional footballer.

External links

1982 births
Living people
Russian footballers
Association football forwards
FC Torpedo-BelAZ Zhodino players
FC Sokol Saratov players
FC Sheksna Cherepovets players
FC Novokuznetsk players
FC Zenit-Izhevsk players
Belarusian Premier League players
Russian expatriate footballers
Expatriate footballers in Belarus